Rayakoski (lit. border rapids) is a rural locality (an inhabited locality) in Pechengsky District of Murmansk Oblast, Russia, located adjacent to the tripoint between Finland, Norway, and Russia. Population: 238 (2010 Census).

Overview
Rayakoski is located around the Rayakoski Hydroelectric Power Plant, built in 1956.

History
In 1947, Finland sold the 169 square kilometer (65 sq mi) Jäniskoski area with its hydroelectric plant, in exchange for Soviet-confiscated German investments in Finland.

References

Notes

Sources

External links
Unofficial website of Rayakoski 

Rural localities in Murmansk Oblast
